Julianna Lisziewicz (born 1959) is a Hungarian immunologist. Lisziewicz headed many research teams that have discovered and produced immunotheraputic drugs to treat diseases like cancer and chronic infections like HIV/AIDS. Some of these drugs have been successfully used in clinical trials.

Education 
Lisziewicz graduated from Budapest University of Technology in Budapest, Hungary with an MSc in Chemistry and Biology in 1982. She went on to earn her Ph.D. in Molecular Biology at the Max-Planck Institute in Germany. Lisziewicz did post doctoral research at the Max-Planck Institute of Experimental Medicine from 1985-1989.

Career

National Institutes of Health 

Lisziewicz worked at the National Institutes of Health (NIH) from 1989-1995. During her time working at the National Cancer Institute she was the Head of the Antiviral Unit at the Laboratory of Tumor Cell Biology.

Research Institute for Genetic and Human Therapy (RIGHT) 

In 1995, Lisziewicz and her colleague Franco Lori founded the Research Institute for Genetic and Human Therapy (RIGHT), where Lisziewicz worked as the Director. RIGHT is a non-profit organization based in the United States and Italy that funds research to develop immunologic technologies, create new therapies, and research vaccines for many chronic diseases like HIV/AIDS. RIGHT strives to quickly put their discoveries to use in patient treatments.

Genetic Immunity, Inc. 

Lisziewicz founded Genetic Immunity, Inc., and worked as the President and the CEO of the company. Genetic Immunity is a private clinical-stage biotechnology company in the United States and Hungary. Genetic Immunity works to create and commercialize immunotherapeutic biologics to treat chronic viral infections, allergies, and cancers to prolong the life of the patient and improve their quality of life.

TREOS Bio 

TREOS Bio is a company that develops precision vaccines to treat and prevent cancer using computational immune-oncology. Lisziewicz worked as the Chief Scientific Officer of TREOS Bio.

Research

Antisense oligonucleotides 

While working at the National Institute of Health, Lisziewicz worked to find a gene therapy approach to treat HIV/AIDS. She based her research on discovering if small portions of gene-stopping DNA (called antisense oligonucleotides) could be created to bind up the viral RNA in retroviruses like HIV so that the virus could not make more copies of itself to continue the infection. Small pieces of messenger RNA (or mRNA) carry a copy of the cell's DNA to the ribosomes where the mRNA directs the ribosomes to create the proteins that the cells need. Viruses (like HIV) have their own set of mRNA, and they use the ribosomes of the cell they infected to make new viruses to propagate the infection throughout the body. Lisziewicz's idea was to create antisense oligonucleotides that are complementary to the HIV's viral mRNA. These complementary DNA pieces can bind to the HIV viral mRNA and prevent the HIV virus from replicating itself. The use of antisense oligonucleotides worked very well in cell cultures, and was quickly transferred to clinical trials.

DermaVir 

DermaVir immunotherapy was created during Lisziewicz's research at the National Cancer Institute in Bethesda, Maryland. She worked to produce gene and antisense therapies to treat HIV/AIDS, and researched how the immune system controls HIV in tissue culture and in monkey models. She applied these results to the treatment of HIV patients in clinical trials. Lisziewicz discovered and headed the preclinical and clinical development of DermaVir HIV immunotherapy. Under Lisziewicz's direction, DermaVir successfully completed a Phase 2 clinical trial.

DermaVir is a topical vaccine that is applied with a patch to the skin. It is a new immunization strategy that uses dendritic cells to increase viral antigen production. DermaVir contains a plasmid that expresses all of the HIV proteins except integrase. This stimulates an immune response to attack the cells infected with HIV.

DermaVir has been proven safe and immunogenic in several clinical trials, one of which was in collaboration with the Division of AIDS (DAIDS). In one trial, Lisziewicz's research team compared the immunogenicity of topical-based and ex vivo dendritic cell-based DermaVir in rhesus macaques. As a result, it was discovered that both vaccinations induced CD4 helper T cells and CD8 memory T cells that are specific to simian immunodeficiency virus. The CD4 helper T cells and CD8 memory T cells were identified using an in vivo skin test and an in vitro intracellular cytokine-based assay. The topical DermaVir vaccine is an improvement upon the ex vivo dendritic cell- based immunization that could offer a new alternative therapy for patients with HIV.

PolyPEPI™ 

An investigation Lisziewicz was involved with when she was working at TREOS Bio is how human leukocyte antigen (HLA) genes regulate immune responses. This research led to the development of a computational immune-oncology technology that can determine a patient's natural T cell response to tumor antigens. As a result, TREOS Bio found there was a correlation between a patient's HLA gene sequence and how well their immunotherapies worked. PolyPEPI™ immunotherapies to treat a number of cancer indications were created by TREOS Bio using the computational immune-oncology.

Langerhans cell-targeting DNA vaccines 

Langerhans cells are a natural agent of antigen release. They are the precursors of dendritic cells in the skin and mucosa. Lisziewicz and her team developed synthetic nanoparticles that act like pathogens and specially target Langerhans cells in epidermal cell cultures. When these nanoparticles are applied topically to human subjects, a strong immune response was observed. This vaccine has been clinically proven, and it opens the door for more new dendritic cell-targeting vaccines to be created for the treatment of cancers.

References 

1959 births
Living people
Molecular biologists
Hungarian women physicians
Budapest University of Technology and Economics alumni
Women immunologists
Hungarian immunologists
Physicians from Budapest